Riley Jack Tufte (born April 10, 1998) is an American professional ice hockey player currently playing with the Texas Stars in the American Hockey League (AHL) as a prospect to the Dallas Stars of the National Hockey League (NHL). He formerly played for the Fargo Force of the United States Hockey League (USHL), and played college ice hockey for the University of Minnesota Duluth. Tufte was drafted in the first round, 25th overall, of the 2016 NHL Entry Draft by the Dallas Stars.

Playing career

Minors and college
Tufte played for Blaine High School in Minnesota, where he was awarded the 2015–16 Mr. Hockey Award in his senior year after he led all of Minnesota Class AA in goals scored. He also played two seasons for the Fargo Force of the USHL, accumulating 19 points in 34 games, before deciding to go back to high school for his senior year. In March 2016, Tufte was invited to Team USA's 2016 National Junior Evaluation Camp, to prepare for the 2016 World Junior Ice Hockey Championships, however he broke his wrist during camp and could not play. Despite this, Tufte became the highest NHL draft pick in the history of the Fargo Force when he was drafted in the first round of the 2016 NHL Entry Draft. Instead of going pro right away, Tufte decided to pursue higher education at the University of Minnesota Duluth.

Tufte missed the beginning of his freshman season due to an injury but he completed the season with 16 points. He was off to a stronger start in his sophomore season, leading the team in scoring as they advanced through the NCAA Men's Ice Hockey Championship.

Professional
On April 17, 2019, Tufte signed a three-year, entry-level contract with the Dallas Stars after the conclusion of his junior collegiate season.

International play
Tufte's played in both the 2014 Under-17 Five Nations Cup and the 2014 World U-17 Hockey Challenge. He helped Team USA place second in the 2014 Under-17 Five Nations Cup.
 
Tufte competed in the 2015 Ivan Hlinka Memorial Tournament for Team USA, who finished fifth in the tournament. He later competed at the 2018 World Junior Ice Hockey Championships where he helped Team USA secure a bronze medal.

Personal life
Tufte was born and grew up in Coon Rapids, Minnesota with three siblings, his father Jamie, and mother Amy, who is a nurse. At the age of 11, Tufte was diagnosed with Type 1 diabetes. As a child, he received an inspirational letter from retired NHL player Toby Petersen who also suffered from diabetes. In February of 2020 Riley and his wife, Morgan, welcomed their first son.

Career statistics

Regular season and playoffs

International

References

External links
 

1998 births
Living people
American men's ice hockey left wingers
Dallas Stars draft picks
Dallas Stars players
Fargo Force players
Ice hockey players from Minnesota
National Hockey League first-round draft picks
Minnesota Duluth Bulldogs men's ice hockey players
People from Coon Rapids, Minnesota
People from Ham Lake, Minnesota
People with type 1 diabetes
Texas Stars players